Victoria Claire Lucass (born 11 September 1990), known as Vicki Lucass, is a competitor in synchronized swimming who represented Great Britain in the team event at the 2012 London Olympics.

References 

1990 births
Living people
British synchronised swimmers
Olympic synchronised swimmers of Great Britain
Synchronized swimmers at the 2012 Summer Olympics
People from Frimley